Lower Baker Dam (or simply Baker Dam) is a dam across the Baker River one mile north of Concrete, Washington. The dam is operated by Puget Sound Energy as part of the Baker River Hydroelectric Project.

It spans the Baker River in a narrow reach known as Eden Canyon, just above the river's confluence with the Skagit River. At full capacity the dam's hydroelectric plant can generate 79 megawatts of power.

References

Dams in Washington (state)
Hydroelectric power plants in Washington (state)
Buildings and structures in Skagit County, Washington
United States power company dams
Dams completed in 1925
Puget Sound Energy